A semi-automatic rifle is an autoloading rifle that fires a single cartridge with each pull of the trigger, and uses part of the fired cartridge's energy to eject the case and load another cartridge into the chamber. For comparison, a bolt-action rifle requires the user to cycle the bolt manually before they can fire a second time, and a fully automatic rifle fires continuously until the trigger is released.

History
In 1883 Hiram Maxim patented in Britain a recoil-operated conversion of a Winchester rifle. In 1884 another recoil-operated semi-automatic rifle was patented by the American Horace Updegraff. Another one of the first designs of a recoil-operated semi-automatic rifle is attributed to Ferdinand Mannlicher, who unveiled the design in 1885 based on work begun in 1883. Other non-gas operated semi-automatic models were the Model 85 and Mannlicher Models 91, 93 and 95 rifles. The designs were deeply flawed and never made past the conceptual/prototype stage due to issues inherent to the black powder used in their cartridges (based around the Austrian 11×58mmR M/77), such as insufficient velocity and excessive fouling; automatic firearms would only become feasible after smokeless powder became widespread. Mannlicher's designs were, nonetheless, the forerunner of automatic rifles and served as a base for a number of future weapons, such as Browning machine guns (M1917, M1919 and M2) and the Lewis gun. Furthermore, from the early 1890s up until his death in 1904, Mannlicher produced smokeless powder versions of his guns.

Blowback semi-automatic

In 1903 and 1905, the Winchester Repeating Arms Company introduced the first low-power blowback (non-gas operated) semi-automatic rimfire and centerfire rifles. The Winchester Model 1903 and Winchester Model 1905 operated on the principle of blowback to function semi-automatically. Designed by T.C. Johnson, the Model 1903 achieved commercial success and continued to be manufactured until 1932, when the Winchester Model 63 replaced it.

By the early 20th century, several manufacturers had introduced semi-automatic .22 rifles, including Winchester, Remington, Fabrique Nationale, and Savage Arms, all using the direct blowback system of operation. Winchester introduced a .351 Winchester Self-Loading semi-automatic rifle, the Model 1907, as an upgrade to the Model 1905, utilizing a blowback system of operation, offering more power than its .22 counterpart. Both the Model 1905 and Model 1907 saw limited military and police use.

Early semi-automatic rifles

In 1906, Remington Arms introduced the "Remington Auto-loading Repeating Rifle". Remington advertised this rifle, renamed the "Model 8" in 1911, as a sporting rifle. It was sold in Europe by FN Herstal as the "FN Browning 1900". This is a locked-breech, long recoil action designed by John Browning. The rifle was offered in .25, .30, .32, and .35 caliber models, and gained popularity among civilians as well as some law enforcement officials who appreciated the combination of a semi-automatic action and relatively powerful rifle cartridges. In 1936 the Model 81 superseded the Model 8, and was offered in .300 Savage as well as the original Remington calibers.

In 1908, General Manuel Mondragón patented the world's first gas-operated semi-automatic rifle, the Mondragón rifle, designated the M1908. The rifle was used by Mexican forces in the Mexican Revolution, making Mexico the first nation to use a semi-automatic rifle in battle, in 1911.

Shortly after the Mondragón rifle was produced, France had its own semi-automatic rifle, the Fusil Automatique Modele 1917. This is a locked breech, gas-operated action which is similar in its mechanical principles to the subsequent American M1 Garand. The M1917 was fielded during the latter stages of World War I, where it did not receive a favorable reception among troops. However, its shortened and improved version, the Model 1918, gave complete satisfaction during the Moroccan Rif War from 1920 to 1926. Still, the bolt-action Lebel Model 1886 rifle remained the standard French infantry rifle until replaced in 1936 by the MAS-36, also a bolt action, despite the various semi-automatic rifles designed between 1918 and 1935.

Other nations experimented with self-loading rifles during the interwar period, including the United Kingdom, which had intended to replace the bolt-action Lee–Enfield with a self-loading rifle, but this plan had to be discarded when the Second World War became imminent, shifting its emphasis to speeding up re-armament with existing weapons.

Gas-operated rifles

In 1937, the American M1 Garand was historically significant as it was the first semi automatic service rifle. The gas-operated M1 Garand was developed by Canadian-born John Garand for the U.S. government at the Springfield Armory in Springfield, Massachusetts. After years of research and testing, the first production model of the M1 Garand was unveiled in 1937. During World War II, the M1 Garand gave American infantrymen an advantage over their opponents, most of whom were issued slower firing bolt-action rifles. General George S. Patton described the M1 Garand as "the greatest battle implement ever devised."

The Soviet AVS-36, SVT-38, and SVT-40, as well as the German Gewehr 43, were semi-automatic gas-operated rifles issued during World War II in relatively small numbers. In practice, they did not replace the bolt-action rifle as a standard infantry weapon of their respective nations - Germany produced 402,000 Gewehr 43 rifles, and over 14,000,000 of the Kar98k.

Another gas-operated semi-automatic rifle developed toward the end of World War II was the SKS. Designed by Sergei Gavrilovich Simonov in 1945, it came equipped with a bayonet and could be loaded with ten rounds, using a stripper clip. It was the first widely issued rifle to use the 7.62×39mm cartridge, and the SKS, along with its Chinese copy, the Type 56, is one of the most popular semi-automatic rifles. By the end of World War II, however, semi-automatic rifles had been largely superseded in military usage by their fully automatic counterparts - weapons such as the AK-47, FN FAL and M16 limited the viability of widespread deployment of semi-automatic rifles. 

Gradually, military doctrine placed less emphasis on individual marksmanship, as a large volume of fire was deemed more important - during World War II, American ground forces fired approximately 25,000 rounds for each enemy killed. In the Korean War, this was raised to 50,000, and in the Vietnam War it was 200,000. The first fully automatic rifle to see widespread usage was the German StG 44, which was well liked by troops, as the 30-round, selective fire rifle gave them much more flexibility than their service rifle, the bolt action Karabiner 98k. Ultimately, automatic rifles would become standard in military usage, as their firepower was superior to that of a semi-automatic rifle, but both semi-automatics and even bolt actions are still used worldwide in military service in specific roles, such as designated marksman rifles where the greater accuracy compared to automatics is valued. Furthermore, to accommodate for this greater firepower, battle rifles were mostly replaced by assault rifles, whose lighter bullets allowed more to be carried at once, but where semi-automatic rifles continue to be used, they are usually in higher calibers, such as the .50 BMG Barrett M82.

Operation

Semi-automatic weapons use gas, blow-forward, blowback or recoil energy to eject the spent cartridge after the round has moved down the barrel, chambering a new cartridge from its magazine, and resetting the action. This enables another round to be fired once the trigger is depressed again.

Semi-automatic rifles can be efficiently fed by an en-bloc clip, external magazine, or stripper clip.

The self-loading design was a successor to earlier rifles that required manual cycling of the weapon after each shot, such as the bolt-action rifle or repeating rifles. The ability to automatically load the next round results in an increase in the rounds per minute the operator can fire.

Advantages
The primary advantage of self-loading rifles is the possibility of increasing the number of effective shots fired within any given time period by avoiding the necessity for changing the aiming position of the rifle to manually chamber new cartridges. The actual number of hits per unit of time depends upon the magazine capacity and the availability of detachable magazines, but semi-automatic rifles can typically more than double the number of hits from comparable manually-loaded rifles at close range and increase the number of hits by about 50 percent at longer distances which require more precise aiming. Firing for prolonged periods may increase this advantage as the manual-loading process can cause fatigue. The additional weight of springs and fittings using a portion of the cartridge energy to reload self-loading rifles have the additional advantage of reducing recoil.

Disadvantages
The self-loading mechanism tuned for cartridges of specified dimensions and power may fail to reload dirty or bent cartridges that will otherwise fire satisfactorily. The self-loading mechanism may fail to extract empty low-power cartridge cases useful for training, and high-power cartridges useful at longer ranges may damage the self-loading mechanism. Some self-loading rifles require externally lubricated cartridges vulnerable to dirt adhesion. Any reliability problems causing failure of the self-loading mechanism to function as designed may eliminate the advantage of increased hits per unit of time, and may actually reduce the comparative rate of fire below what is possible with manually-loaded rifles if the self-loading rifle is not designed for convenient manual-loading. The United Kingdom regarded the reliable rate of fire from manually-loaded rifles to be nearly as high as self-loading rifles as recently as World War II.

Semi-automatic rifles are uniquely susceptible to slamfire malfunctions caused by abrupt cartridge acceleration during self-loading. Slamfire discharges are unlikely to hit the target, and may cause collateral damage.

The time required for changing or reloading magazines can weaken the effectiveness of a rifle, as it imposes an effective duration limit on the continuous rate of fire of any rifle. High-capacity magazines increase the weight of the rifle, and typically reduce feeding reliability due to the varying spring tension from a full to a nearly empty magazine. Detachable magazines in general are usually less durable than internal magazines.

The complexity of a self-loading mechanism makes self-loading rifles more expensive to manufacture and heavier than manually-loaded rifles. The semi-automatic M1 Garand weighs about 410 grams (0.9 lb) more (seven percent heavier) than the manually-loaded M1903 Springfield it replaced. American development of a self-loading infantry rifle began with the .276 Pedersen cartridge in recognition of the difficulties of producing reliable self-loading mechanisms for more powerful cartridges. Although the M1 Garand was ultimately adapted to fire the .30-06 Springfield cartridge at the insistence of General Douglas MacArthur, most subsequent self-loading rifles for infantry use have been chambered for less powerful cartridges to reduce weight making rifles easier to carry.

Select examples

Civilian uses for semi-automatic rifles 
Semi-automatic rifles are commonly used by civilians for sport shooting, hunting, and self-defense, as they are cheaper and less heavily regulated than their fully automatic counterparts.

Sport shooting 
Target shooting has a long history, pre-dating the firearm, as the first example of it would be archery, and as weapons that demanded user accuracy developed, so did their usage in competitions. Today, semi-automatic rifles are one of the more popular firearms in sport shooting. There are various types of sport shooting, ranging from rapid fire shooting, target shooting, which is predominantly accuracy based, and distance shooting. Shooting clubs in America became increasingly commonplace in the 1830s, and have since grown in popularity.  Semi-automatic rifles are commonly used in sport shooting events because of their accuracy, versatility, and their light weight- which has invited more people, specifically women and children, to compete as well.

Hunting 
Semi-automatic rifles have grown in status among hunters. Many hunters are adopting semi-automatic rifles, particularly AR-15 style rifles to take advantage of their compact design and modularity. Effectively making it easier to traverse rugged terrain while tracking a target. And providing a large variety of customization ranging from scopes and muzzle devices, to different calibers. Semi-automatic fire greatly assists in maintaining one's sight picture, which is especially important when follow-up shots are required. Due to their demand, the manufacturers of semi-automatic firearms have greatly increased the effective firing distance of their products, compared to the first semi-automatics sold on the civilian market.

Self defense 
Semi-automatic rifles are sometimes used for self-defense. Most semi-automatic rifles are rather lightweight and simple to operate, without compromising accuracy. Semi-automatic rifles are able to quickly dispatch multiple targets in a home invasion. Most semi-automatic rifles also have sights which can be adjusted for range, providing versatility.

See also
 Assault rifle (not to be confused with "Assault weapon")
 Assault weapon - certain semi-automatic rifles are classified as assault weapons in some jurisdictions
 Firearm
 Pistol
 Revolver
 Semi-automatic pistol
 AR-15 style rifle
 Personal defense weapon
 Rifle
 Automatic rifle
 Bolt-action rifle
 Semi-automatic firearm
 Semi-automatic pistol
 Semi-automatic shotgun
 Shotgun
 Single-shot
 List of semi-automatic rifles

References

External links
Early Semiauto Rifles

Austrian inventions